Moghanak may refer to:

Moghanak-e Olya
Moghanak-e Sofla
Moqanak, Qazvin
Moqanak, Tehran

See also
Moqanak (disambiguation)